Ulmus pumila, the Siberian elm, is a tree native to Asia. It is also known as the Asiatic elm and dwarf elm, but sometimes miscalled the 'Chinese Elm' (Ulmus parvifolia). U. pumila has been widely cultivated throughout Asia, North America, Argentina, and southern Europe, becoming naturalized in many places, notably across much of the United States.

Description 

The bark is dark gray, irregularly longitudinally fissured. The branchlets are yellowish gray, glabrous or pubescent, unwinged and without a corky layer, with scattered lenticels. The winter buds dark brown to red-brown, globose to ovoid. The perfect, apetalous wind-pollinated flowers bloom for one week in early spring, before the leaves emerge, in tight fascicles (bundles) on the last year's branchlets. Flowers emerging in early February are often damaged by frost (causing the species to be dropped from the Dutch elm breeding programme). Unlike most elms, the Siberian elm is able to self-pollinate successfully.

The wind-dispersed samarae are whitish tan, orbicular to rarely broadly obovate or elliptical, glabrous except for pubescence on stigmatic surface; the stalk , the perianth persistent. The seed is at centre of the samara or occasionally slightly toward apex but not reaching the apical notch. Flowering and fruiting occur March to May. Ploidy: 2n = 28. The tree also suckers readily from its roots.

The tree is short-lived in temperate climates, rarely reaching more than 60 years of age, but in its native environment may live to between 100 and 150 years.

Taxonomy 
The species was described by Peter Simon Pallas in the 18th century from specimens from Transbaikal.

Two varieties were traditionally recognized: var. pumila and var. arborea, the latter now treated as a cultivar, U. pumila 'Pinnato-ramosa'.

Distribution and habitat 

The tree is native to Central Asia, eastern Siberia, the Russian Far East, Mongolia, Tibet, northern China, India (northern Kashmir) and Korea. It is the last tree species encountered in the semi-desert regions of Central Asia.

Ecology

Pests and diseases 
The tree has considerable variability in resistance to Dutch elm disease; for example, trees from north-western and north-eastern China exhibit significantly higher tolerance than those from central and southern China. Moreover, it is highly susceptible to damage from many insects and parasites, including the elm leaf beetle Xanthogaleruca luteola, the Asian 'zigzag' sawfly Aproceros leucopoda, Elm Yellows, powdery mildew, cankers, aphids, leaf spot and, in the Netherlands, coral spot fungus Nectria cinnabarina. U. pumila is the most resistant of all the elms to verticillium wilt.

Invasiveness and spontaneous hybridization 
In North America, Ulmus pumila has become an invasive species in much of the region from central Mexico northward across the eastern and central United States to Ontario, Canada. It also hybridizes in the wild with the native U. rubra (slippery elm) in the central United States, prompting conservation concerns for the latter species. In South America, the tree has spread across much of the Argentine pampas.

In Europe it has spread widely in Spain, and hybridizes extensively there with the native field elm (U. minor), contributing to conservation concerns for the latter species.  Research is ongoing into the extent of hybridisation with U. minor in Italy.

Ulmus pumila is often found in abundance along railroads and in abandoned lots and on disturbed ground.  The gravel along railroad beds provides ideal conditions for its growth: well-drained, nutrient poor soil, and high light conditions; these beds provide corridors which facilitate its spread.  Owing to its high sunlight requirements, it seldom invades mature forests, and is primarily a problem in cities and open areas, as well as along transportation corridors.

The species is now listed in Japan as an alien species recognized as established in Japan or found in the Japanese wild.

Cultivation 

U. pumila was introduced into Spain as an ornamental, probably during the reign of Philip II (1556–98), and from the 1930s into Italy. In these countries it has naturally hybridized with the field elm (U. minor). In Italy it was widely used in viniculture, notably in the Po valley, to support the grape vines until the 1950s, when the demands of mechanization made it unsuitable.

Three specimens were supplied by the Späth nursery of Berlin to the Royal Botanic Garden Edinburgh (RBGE) in 1902 as U. pumila, in addition to specimens of the narrow-leaved U. pumila cultivar 'Pinnato-ramosa'. One was planted in RBGE; the two not planted in the Garden may survive in Edinburgh, as it was the practice of the Garden to distribute trees about the city. Kew Gardens obtained specimens of U. pumila from the Arnold Arboretum in 1908 and, as U. pekinensis, via the Veitch Nurseries in 1910 from William Purdom in northern China. A specimen obtained from Späth and planted in 1914 stood in the Ryston Hall arboretum, Norfolk, in the early 20th century. The tree was propagated and marketed by the Hillier & Sons nursery, Winchester, Hampshire, from 1962 to 1977, during which time over 500 were sold. More recently, the popularity of U. pumila in the Great Britain has been almost exclusively as a bonsai subject, and mature trees are largely restricted to arboreta. In the UK the TROBI Champions grow at Thorp Perrow Arboretum, Yorkshire,  ×  in 2004, and at St Ann's Well Gardens, Hove, Sussex  ×  in 2009.

U. pumila is said to have been introduced to the US in 1905 by Prof. John George Jack, and later by Frank Nicholas Meyer, though 'Siberian elm' appears in some 19th-century US nursery catalogues. The tree was cultivated at the United States Department of Agriculture (USDA) Experimental Station at Mandan, North Dakota, where it flourished. It was consequently selected by the USDA for planting in shelter belts across the prairies in the aftermath of the Dustbowl disasters, where its rapid growth and tolerance for drought and cold initially made it a great success. However, the species later proved susceptible to numerous maladies. Attempts to find a more suitable cultivar were initiated in 1997 by the Plant Materials Center of the USDA, which established experimental plantations at Akron, Colorado, and Sidney, Nebraska. The study, no. 201041K, will conclude in 2020.

The seeds lose their viability rapidly after maturity unless placed on suitable germination conditions or dried and placed at low temperatures. The species has a high sunlight requirement and is not shade-tolerant; with adequate light it exhibits rapid growth.  The tree is also fairly intolerant of wet ground conditions, growing better on well-drained soils. While it is very resistant to drought and severe cold, and able to grow on poor soils, its short period of dormancy, flowering early in spring followed by continuous growth until the first frosts of autumn, renders it vulnerable to frost damage.

As an ornamental U. pumila is a very poor tree, tending to be short-lived, with brittle wood and poor crown shape, but it has nevertheless enjoyed some popularity owing to its rapid growth and provision of shade. The Siberian Elm has been described as "one of the world's worst...  ornamental trees that does not deserve to be planted anywhere". Yet in the US during the 1950s, the tree was also widely promoted as a fast-growing hedging substitute for privet, and as a consequence is now commonly found in nearly all states.

Cultivars 
Valued for the high resistance of some clones to Dutch elm disease, over a dozen selections have been made to produce hardy ornamental cultivars, although several may no longer be in cultivation:

Some authorities consider the cultivar 'Berardii' a form of U. pumila. Nottingham elm, considered an Ulmus × hollandica by Richens, was marketed from the 19th century as 'Siberian elm'.

Hybrid cultivars 
 U. 'Androssowii', U. × arbuscula, U. 'Karagatch'

The species has been widely hybridized in the United States and Italy to create robust trees of more native appearance with high levels of resistance to Dutch elm disease:
 Arno, Cathedral, Coolshade, Fiorente, Homestead, Lincoln, Morton Plainsman = , Morton Stalwart = , New Horizon, Plinio, Regal, Rosehill, San Zanobi, Urban, Willis, Dutch clone '260' (not released to commerce).

Uses 
The unripe seeds have long been eaten by the peoples of Manchuria, and during the Great Chinese Famine they also became one of the most important foodstuffs in the Harbin region. The leaves were also gathered, to the detriment of the trees, prompting a prohibition order by the authorities, which was largely ignored. The leaves eaten raw are not very palatable, but stewed and prepared with Kaoliang or Foxtail millet make a better tasting and more filling meal.

U. pumila in literature and travel writing
The "dwarf-" or "shrub-elms" of the North Caucasus, along with other local flora, appear in the opening description of Tolstoy's story 'The Raid' (1853).

Nicholas Roerich describes a specimen discovered on his travels through Mongolia:
We are in the deserts of Mongolia. It was hot and dusty yesterday. From faraway thunder was approaching. Some of our friends became tired from climbing the stony holy hills of Shiret Obo. While already returning to the camp, we noticed in the distance a huge elm tree – 'karagatch', - lonely, towering amidst the surrounding endless desert. The size of the tree, its somewhat familiar outlines attracted us into its shadow. Botanical considerations led us to believe that in the wide shade of the giant there might be some interesting herbs. Soon, all the co-workers gathered around the two mighty stems of the karagatch. The deep, deep shadow of the tree covered about 50 feet across. The powerful tree-stems were covered with fantastic burr growths. In the rich foliage, birds were singing and the beautiful branches were stretched out in all directions, as if wishing to give shelter to all pilgrims.

Accessions

North America 
 Arnold Arboretum, US. Acc. nos. 17923, 638-79, 673-87.
 Denver Botanic Gardens, US. Acc. no. 900534.
 Dominium Arboretum, Ottawa, Ontario, Canada. No acc. details available.
 Holden Arboretum, US. Acc. nos. 99-868, 72-218
 Longwood Gardens, US. Acc. no. 1962-0512.
 Morton Arboretum, US. Acc. nos. 542-49, 325-70, 53-74, 172-U.
 UBC Botanical Garden and Centre for Plant Research, US. Acc. no. 027560-0284-1989.

Europe 
 Arboretum of Warsaw University of Life Sciences , University of Life Sciences, Warsaw, Poland. 2 trees, no accession details available.
 Brighton & Hove City Council, UK. NCCPG Elm Collection.
 Dubrava Arboretum, Lithuania. No details available.
 Grange Farm Arboretum, Lincolnshire, UK. Acc. no. 521.
Hergest Croft Gardens, Herefordshire, UK. One tree, no accession details available.
 Hortus Botanicus Nationalis, Salaspils, Latvia. Acc. nos. 18162,3,4.
 Royal Botanic Gardens, Wakehurst Place, UK. Acc. no. 2000-4449.
 Sir Harold Hillier Gardens. Acc. no. 2016.0386, grown from seed of tree in Utah, US. 
 Tallinn Botanic Garden, Estonia. . No accession details available.
 Thorp Perrow Arboretum, Yorkshire, UK. British Champion tree, 19  m high, 70 cm d.b.h. in 2004.
 Westonbirt Arboretum , Tetbury, Glos., UK. Two trees planted 1981, no acc.details.
Wijdemeren City Council, Netherlands. Elm Arboretum. U. pumila 'Puszta' planted Smeerdijkgaarde, Kortenhoef 2013; Dammerweg, Nederhorst den Berg 2015. 5 'Aurescens' planted 2015 Overmeerseweg, 'Pinnato-ramosa' planted 2015 Dammerweg, 'Mierenbos' and 'Poort Bulten' planted Brilhoek and cemetery Hornhof, Nederhorst den Berg in 2019

Australasia 
 Alma Park, St Kilda, Victoria, Australia. One specimen, listed on the National Trust of Victoria's Significant Tree Register.
 Eastwoodhill Arboretum , Gisborne, New Zealand. 2 trees, details not known.

Africa 
 Arboretum of Haramaya University, Haramaya, Ethiopia

Nurseries

Europe 
Van Den Berk (UK) Ltd., London, UK

References

External links 

 North Dakota State University: trees handbook, Siberian elm pages.
 Evaluation of the Siberian Elm (Ulmus pumila), USDA, pages 42, 43.
 Siberian Elm, Ulmus pumila Diagnostic photographs; specimen at Morton Arboretum
 
 Notes on Elm in the Korqin Sandy Lands, Northeast China.
 Ulmus pumila - information, genetic conservation units and related resources. European Forest Genetic Resources Programme (EUFORGEN) 
  Specimen from Harbin, Manchuria (1953)
 Muséum national d'Histoire naturelle, Paris; herbarium specimen P06883116, labelled Ulmus, Mongolia

pumila
Garden plants of Asia
Ornamental trees
Plants described in 1753
Taxa named by Carl Linnaeus
Ulmus articles with images
Elm species and varieties
Flora of the Russian Far East
Trees of China
Trees of Korea
Trees of Mongolia
Trees of Siberia